John James Atherton (1917–1961) was an English footballer who played in the Football League for Brighton & Hove Albion and Preston North End. He was born in Preston, England. He died in 1961.

References

1917 births
1961 deaths
Brighton & Hove Albion F.C. players
English Football League players
English footballers
Preston North End F.C. players
Association football inside forwards